Herbert Wollmann (born 14 January 1951) is a German politician for the SPD and since 2021 member of the Bundestag, the federal diet.

Life and politics
Wollmann was born 1951 in Berlin and became a member of the Bundestag in 2021.

References

Living people
1988 births
People from Berlin
Politicians from Berlin
Members of the Bundestag 2021–2025
Members of the Bundestag for the Social Democratic Party of Germany